Fulton station is an Amtrak intercity train station in Fulton, Kentucky, near the Purchase Parkway and Highway 51. The station is a flag stop on the City of New Orleans route, served only when passengers have tickets to and from the station.

This is an unstaffed station; there is no agent and no assistance. The previous station house was torn down by the Illinois Central Gulf Railroad in 1979.

The tracks used were once part of the Illinois Central Railroad system, and are now owned by the CN.

References

External links 

Fulton Amtrak Station (USA Rail Guide -- Train Web)

Amtrak stations in Kentucky
Buildings and structures in Fulton County, Kentucky
Transportation in Fulton County, Kentucky